Na Kluea ('salt farm') may refer to the following places in Thailand:

 Na Kluea, Samut Prakan
 Na Kluea, Kantang district, Trang province
 Na Kluea, Bang Lamung district, Chonburi province